Helmut Andreas Paul Grieshaber or HAP Grieshaber (15 February 1909 – 12 May 1981) was a German artist. His preferred medium was large format woodcuts.

Biography
Grieshaber was born in Rot an der Rot. He went to school in Nagold and later in Reutlingen. From the age of 17 he was apprenticed to the printing trade in Reutlingen. While here, from 1926 to 1928, he studied art in nearby Stuttgart. He then travelled extensively to Paris, London, Egypt, Arabia and Greece. At the beginning of the Nazi regime, from 1933 until 1940, Grieshaber was banned from his profession. During that time he scratched out a living as an untrained labourer in the town of Reutlingen. He spent the war years unwillingly in the German army and, as a prisoner of war, doing forced labour in Belgian mines. After the war he returned to Germany, living in a small cottage on the Achalm, and concentrated on doing large-scale woodcuts and posters. From 1951 to 1953 he taught at the Bernsteinschule school of art. Between 1955 and 1960 he taught at the Kunstakademie (Academy of Fine Arts) in Karlsruhe as successor to Erich Heckel.

Grieshaber was a long-time pacifist and political activist, not only against the dictatorships in Greece and Chile, but also in the area of conservation and ecology, against nuclear plants, and in favour of a bridging between the two Germanies. His companion in his later years, from 1967 till his death in 1981, was the lyric poet Margarete Hannsmann.

Grieshaber was honoured with numerous prizes and retrospective exhibitions. He exhibited works at the documenta in 1959 and 1964. In honor of his 70th birthday in 1979, large retrospectives were shown in various museums in both parts of Germany. The last prize that Grieshaber was awarded in 1980 was the art prize of the town of Konstanz. Grieshaber died in 1981 in Eningen unter Achalm aged 72 years.

Relations
Grieshaber's daughter, Nani Croze, founded the Kitengela Glass workshop on the Athi-Kapiti plains adjacent to the Nairobi National Park. She is a muralist, experimenting in a range of materials. Her commissioned works can be found all over East Africa. Nani's son, Anselm Croze, has expanded the studio. Together, they create art glass pieces and a large variety of other glass.

Works
Grieshaber's work were influenced by works of Paul Klee and Lyonel Feininger. He took a stab at industrial design in the 1970s with a 500-piece run of the upscale Suomi tableware by Timo Sarpaneva that Grieshaber decorated for the German Rosenthal porcelain maker's Studio Linie.

See also
 List of German painters

References
Exhibition Catalogue (1966, Auckland, New Zealand) - Some of the foregoing information is taken from the catalogue of an exhibition of Greishaber's held during the 1966 Auckland Festival. It is likely that the biography in that document was provided by the artist himself

External links 

 HAP Grieshaber bei art directory
 Polish Way of the Cross on "All About Mary" The University of Dayton's Marian Library/International Marian Research Institute (IMRI) is the world's largest repository of books, artwork and artifacts devoted to Mary, the mother of Christ, and a pontifical center of research and scholarship with a vast presence in cyberspace.
 
 Biographie of HAP Grieshaber (in German)
 HAP Grieshaber, Registry at artfacts.de
 Freundeskreis HAP Grieshaber e. V. (in German) with woodcut
 Special events for the 100th birthday (in German) 
 Nani Croze
 Kenyan Utopia

1909 births
1981 deaths
German artists
Commanders Crosses of the Order of Merit of the Federal Republic of Germany
Recipients of the Order of Merit of Baden-Württemberg